Toribio Rojas Gamboa (born 14 February 1945) is a Costa Rican retired football player who worked for ten years as a manager in Puerto Rico.

Playing career

Club
Rojas earned his place in the history of Ramonense, when he scored the goal that lifted the team to Costa Rica's top tier in 1968.

Managerial career
He managed the Costa Rica National team from 1993 to 1995, but was dismissed in January 1996 after failing at the 1995 UNCAF Nations Cup. In January 1997 he was named manager of Carmelita after resigning from his post at second division Guanacasteca.

In 2006, he announced he would retire in 2009 when his contract with Puerto Rico Islanders would run out.

References

External links
 

1945 births
Living people
Costa Rican footballers
L.D. Alajuelense footballers
A.D. Ramonense players
Costa Rican football managers
Puerto Rico Islanders coaches
USL First Division coaches
Costa Rica national football team managers
Puerto Rico national football team managers
Expatriate football managers in Puerto Rico
Liga FPD players
Association footballers not categorized by position